Indo-Caribbean or Indian-Caribbean people are Indian people in the Caribbean who are descendants of the Jahaji Indian indentured laborers brought by the British, Dutch, and French during the colonial era from the mid-19th century to the early 20th century. A minority are descendants of Indians or other South Asians who immigrated as entrepreneurs, businesspeople, merchants, engineers, doctors, and other professional occupations beginning in the mid-20th century.

Most Indo-Caribbean people live in the English-speaking Caribbean nations, the Dutch-speaking Suriname and the French overseas departments of Guadeloupe, Martinique and French Guiana, with smaller numbers in other Caribbean countries and, following further migration, in North America and Europe.

Indo-Caribbean people may also be referred to as Caribbean Indians, East Indian West Indians, Caribbean Hindustanis, South Asian Caribbeans, or Caribbean Desis, while first-generation Indo-Caribbeans were called Girmitya,  Desi, Hindustani, Kantraki, Mulki (m.) / Mulkin (f.), or Jahaji (m.) / Jahajin (f.). Coolie, meaning hired laborer, was used in the plantation society of the late 19th to early 20th century, however in the present-day it is considered a derogatory way to refer to Indo-Caribbeans and is considered a pejorative.

Sub-groups
Bold highlights major Indo-Caribbean subgroups
Caribbean Islands
 Indians in Barbados
 Indians in the Dominican Republic
 Indo-Grenadians
 Indo-Guadeloupeans
 Indo-Haitians
 Indo-Jamaicans
 Indo-Martiniquais
 Indians in Saint Kitts and Nevis
 Indo-Saint Lucian
 Indo-Trinidadian and Tobagonian
 Indians in the United States Virgin Islands
 Indo-Vincentian

Mainland Caribbean
Indo-Belizeans
 Indo-Guyanese
 Indo-Surinamese
Indians in French Guiana

Primary Indo-Caribbean Diaspora
 Indo-Caribbean Americans
Indo-Caribbean Canadians
 British Indo-Caribbean people
Indians in the Netherlands

Secondary/Migrant Workers Indo-Caribbean Diaspora
 Indians in Venezuela
 Indians in Panama
 Indian immigration to Brazil
 Indians in Argentina
 Indians in Colombia

Mixed Ethnicities of Partial Indo-Caribbean origin
 Anglo-Indian (mixed Indian and British)
 Asian Latin Americans (a.k.a. Tegli; mixed Indian and Hispanic/Latino) 
Asian Hispanic and Latino Americans (mixed Indian and Hispanic/Latino in the U.S.)
 Chindian (mixed Indian and Chinese)
 Dougla (mixed Indian and African)
 Eurasian (mixed Indian and European)
 Luso-Indian (mixed Indian and Portuguese)
 Indo-Amerindian (mixed Indian and Amerindian)

Migration history

From 1838 to 1917, over half a million Indians from the former British Raj or British India and Colonial India, were taken to thirteen mainland and island nations in the Caribbean as indentured workers to address the demand for sugar cane plantation labour following the abolition of slavery.

Sugarcane plantations in the 19th century

Much like cotton, sugarcane plantations motivated large-scale near-enslavement and forced migrations in the 19th and early 20th century.

Following the passage of the 1833 Slavery Abolition Act, many formerly enslaved people left their enslavers. This created an economic chaos for European planters in the Caribbean and Indian Ocean. The hard work in hot, humid farms required a regular, docile and low-waged labour force, which led to the creation of the Indian indenture system. Poor economic conditions in India led to many Indians to look for sources of work. In this system, Indians were taken to British, French and Dutch colonies around the world, including in the Caribbean, to work on cash crop plantations.

The first ships carrying indentured labourers for sugarcane plantations left India in 1838 for the Caribbean region. In fact, the first two shiploads of Indians arrived in British Guiana (modern-day Guyana) on May 5, 1838, on board the Whitby and Hesperus.
These ships had sailed from Calcutta. In the early decades of the sugarcane-driven migrations, the working conditions for the indentured Indian workers were abysmal, due in large part to the lack of care among the planters.. They were confined to their estates and paid a pitiful salary. Any breach of contract brought automatic criminal penalties and imprisonment. Many of these were brought away from their homelands deceptively. Many from inland regions over a thousand kilometers from seaports were promised jobs, were not told the work they were being hired for, or that they would leave their homeland and communities. They were hustled aboard the waiting ships, unprepared for the long and arduous four-month sea journey. Charles Anderson, a special magistrate investigating these sugarcane plantations, wrote to the Colonial Secretary declaring that with few exceptions, the indentured labourers are treated with great and unjust severity; European planters enforced work in sugarcane farms so harshly, that the decaying remains of immigrants were frequently discovered in sugarcane fields. If indentured labourers protested and refused to work, they were not paid or fed by the planters.

The sugarcane plantation-driven migrations led to ethnically significant presence of Indians in Caribbean. In some islands and countries, these Indo-Caribbean migrants now constitute a significant proportion of the population. Sugarcane plantations and citizens of Indian origin continue to thrive in countries such as Guyana, formerly, British Guiana, Jamaica, Trinidad and Tobago, Martinique, French Guiana, Guadeloupe, Grenada, St. Lucia, St. Vincent, St. Kitts, St. Croix, Suriname and Nevis. By some estimates, over 2.5 million people in the Caribbean are of Indian origin. Many have ethnically blended with migrants from other parts of the world, creating a unique syncretic culture.

Though production was centered in the Caribbean, sugarcane production played a significant role in pre-World War II global politics and population movements. France, for example, negotiated with Britain leading to Act XLVI of 1860, whereby large numbers of Indian indentured labourers were brought for sugarcane plantation work in French colonies in the Caribbean region. The Caribbean colonies of the Netherlands too benefitted from the indentured laborers from India.

Arrival of Indian Women in the Caribbean 
The ratio of female to male Indians coming to the Caribbean was for many years extremely low, 3:100 in 1938. The Indian government and the Colonial Office set up a quota system that dictated how many Indian women came to the Caribbean. In 1870, the quota called for 40 Indian women for every 100 Indian men, a quota that often was not met. In total, only 25% of all Indians who emigrated to the Caribbean were women. There were several reasons for fewer Indian women than men emigrating.

It was more expensive for agents to recruit Indian women than men, because not many Indian women wanted to leave India. It was more socially acceptable in India for men to emigrate and seek work. Women were not encouraged to do the same. Another factor dissuading Indian women from going to the Caribbean was the invasive medical examination administered upon arrival, which involved inspection of genitals. Many women did not want to have to undergo this examination and many men would not have wanted this to happen to their wives.

Additionally, the colonial powers present in the Caribbean were not initially interested in convincing Indian women to immigrate. Colonialists saw indentureship as a temporary replacement for the labor that had previously been done by enslaved African people. Their goal was to use Indian men for labor. They did not want Indian people to start families in the Caribbean, which would establish Indian culture and people as a lasting presence in the Caribbean, undermining the power of the indenture system to control all aspects of the laborer's lives and force them into subjugation.

In the late 1800s, there was a change in policy. The late 1880s saw competition in the sugar industry from European beet sugar, and the colonial government knew that having a settled, immobile group of Indian people to exploit for labor would be highly profitable and advantageous in the competition to dominate the sugar industry. Encouraging Indian people to stay in the Caribbean also cut the costs required to bring Indian people back to India. As indentureships ended, the Indian men who had come to work as indentured laborers were given small parcels of land to encourage settlement. Another method of encouraging settlement was to encourage more Indian women to immigrate, since permanent settlement was no longer being discouraged by the colonial powers.

Indian women who were recruited and immigrated to the Caribbean were for the most part married women joining their husbands, single women, women who had been widowed, women trying to escape poverty, and women prostitutes from the cities of Calcutta and Chennai, then called Madras. Under the indenture system, married Indian women were excused from work on the plantations and planters were required to give them medical care and rations. However, the colonial government did not recognize Hindu or Muslim marriages until the 1940s, so many married women were categorized as single and did not receive the few privileges given to married women. Married women who did not have to work in the fields took care of children and expenses. Women who worked were paid less than men.

Post World War II trends

The majority of the Indians living in the English-speaking Caribbean came from eastern Uttar Pradesh and western Bihar which are mostly Hindi-speakers, while those brought to Guadeloupe and Martinique were largely from Andhra Pradesh and Tamil Nadu. About twenty percent (20%) of the indentured were Tamils and Telugus particularly in Trinidad and Tobago, and Guyana.

A minority emigrated from other parts of South Asia, including present-day Pakistan and Bangladesh.

Indo-Caribbeans comprise the largest ethnic group in Guyana, Trinidad and Tobago, and Suriname.

They are the second largest group in Jamaica, Grenada, Saint Vincent and the Grenadines, Saint Lucia, Martinique and Guadeloupe.

There are also small communities in Anguilla, Antigua and Barbuda, The Bahamas, Barbados, Belize, French Guiana, Panama, Dominican Republic, Puerto Rico and the Netherlands Antilles. Small groups also exist in Haiti, where they are sometimes mistakenly referred to as "mulattos".

Contemporary migration
Modern-day immigrants from India (mostly Sindhi merchants) are to be found on Saint-Martin / Sint Maarten, St. Thomas, Curaçao and other islands with duty-free commercial capabilities, where they are active in business. Other Indo-Caribbean people descend from later migrants, including Indian doctors, Gujarati businessmen and migrants from Kenya and Uganda.

Diaspora
Indo-Caribbeans have migrated to the United States, Canada, the Netherlands, France, the United Kingdom, Ireland, and to other parts of the Caribbean and Latin America

Culture

The indentured Indians and their descendants have actively contributed to the evolution of their adopted lands in spite of many difficulties.

Commemoration
In recent years, attempts to commemorate the Indian presence and contributions have come to fruition:

Indian Arrival Day is a holiday celebrated on May 30 in Trinidad and Tobago each year since the 1990s. It was first celebrated in Trinidad and Tobago and then other countries with significant Indian people whose ancestors came as indentured laborers. It commemorates the first arrivals from India to Trinidad and Tobago, on May 30, 1845, on the ship Fatel Razack

In 1995, Jamaica started to celebrate the arrival of Indians in Old Harbour Bay, St. Catherine Parish on May 13.

In 2003, Martinique celebrated the 150th anniversary of Indian arrival. Guadeloupe did the same in 2004. These celebrations were not the fact of just the Indian minority, but the official recognition by the French and local authorities of their integration and their wide-scale contributions in various fields including agriculture,  education, and politics, and to the diversification of the culture of the Creole peoples. Thus, the noted participation of the whole multi-ethnic population of the two islands were in these events.

St. Lucia and many Caribbean countries have dedicated commemorative days to acknowledge the arrival and important contributions of their Indo-Caribbean populations. St. Lucia celebrates its Indo-Caribbean heritage on May 6. Other dates when India Arrival Day is celebrated in the Caribbean include May 5 (Guyana), May 10 (Jamaica), May 30 (Trinidad and Tobago), June 1 (St. Vincent), and June 5 (Suriname).

Notable persons

See also

 Anglophone Caribbean
 Awadhi people
 Bhojpuri people
 Bombay (mango)
 Caribbean Hindustani
 Dhantal
 Hinduism in the West Indies
 Indian Caribbean Museum of Trinidad and Tobago
 Indian diaspora
 Indian people
 Indians in the Netherlands
 Indo-Caribbean music
 Lalla Rookh Museum
 Tamil diaspora
 Tassa

References

Further reading

External links

 Indo-Caribbean Alliance, Inc. - a 501(c)3 non-profit organization providing services and advocacy to New York City's growing Indo-Caribbean community
 Jahajee Sisters: Empowering Indo-Caribbean Women - a movement-building organization, led by Indo-Caribbean women, committed to fighting gender-based violence and advocating for reproductive justice.  Jahajee Sisters fosters solidarity and empowerment through dialogue, arts, leadership development and grassroots organizing.
 South Asian Indentured Labor - Online Archive of Research and Resources - an online archive and living syllabus of text-based resources related to Indian indentureship, with country-specific resources related to Indians indentured to the Caribbean and the Indo-Caribbean diaspora

 
Ethnic groups in the Caribbean